Conrad Diehl (1843–1918) was Mayor of the City of Buffalo, New York, serving from 1898 to 1901. He was born in Buffalo on July 17, 1843. He graduated from the University of Buffalo with a medical degree in 1866. On May 5, 1869, he married Caroline Trautmann in New York City; she died in 1888 and he remarried in 1892 to Lois Masten, head nurse at Buffalo General Hospital. From 1870 to 1878, he was surgeon and major of the 65th Regiment, of the New York National Guard. From 1874 on, he was either attending or consulting physician at Buffalo General Hospital.

Diehl was elected mayor of Buffalo on November 2, 1897, as the Democratic candidate. In 1898, an amendment to extend the Mayor's term to four years was adopted. During his term, the world saw the first successful generation and transmission of electricity by the power of Niagara Falls to Buffalo. In addition, the city was in the throes of preparing for the Pan-American Exposition. Mayor Diehl had formally invited President William McKinley to the Exposition and was with him when he was struck down by Leon Czolgosz.

He did not run for re-election. After his term, he returned to private life and his medical practice. He died on February 20, 1918.

References

1843 births
1918 deaths
Mayors of Buffalo, New York
19th-century American politicians